Ganesh Govind Bodas (1880–1965), also known as Ganpatrao Bodas, was an Indian stage actor known for performing Marathi plays.

Early life 
Ganesh was born in Shevgaon village, Ahmadnagar district, India in 1880. His schooling was up to the secondary level. He grew interest in both music and acting. He was an amateur actor in school, but his official entry in theatre took place in 1895 when he joined the Kirloskar Natak Mandali.

Career 
Though Bodas did not have proper training in classical music, he developed a very good musical sensibility when G. B. Deval coached him for minor female roles in the Mandali's plays such as Kirloskar's Sanbhadra, Deval's Samshaykallol, S. K. Kolhatkar's Mukanayak (as Speechless Protagonist) in 1901, and Khadilkar's Manapaman (Honour and Dishonour) in 1911. He was given the lead in these productions. He did a wide variety of roles, mythological to social and serious to comic. Along with Govindrao Tembe, he helped Bal Gandharva to form the Gandharva Natak Mandali in 1913. His characterizations included the farcical Phalgunrao in Samshaykallol, Krishna in Khadilkar's Sivayamvar (Choice of Groom) in 1916, and the alcoholic Sudhakar in Gadkari's Ekach pyala (Just One Glass) in 1919. After the Mandali disintegrated, he acted with many other companies, such as the Yashwant Sangeet Natak Mandali, until 1956. He popularized the "night" system in Marathi theatre whereby actors got paid by the number of nights they performed. His autobiography, Majhi bhumika (My Role) came out in 1940.

Bodas died in 1965 at the age of 85.

References 

1880 births
1965 deaths
Male actors from Maharashtra
Male actors in Marathi theatre
Indian male stage actors
Indian male musical theatre actors
Indian autobiographers
19th-century Indian male actors
20th-century Indian male actors
20th-century Indian male singers
20th-century Indian singers
Male actors from British India
Recipients of the Sangeet Natak Akademi Award